Kubi Gangri is a mountain in the Himalayas of Asia. It has a summit elevation of 6,859 meters above sea level and is located on the international border between Nepal and Tibet, China.

See also
 List of mountains in China
 List of mountains in Nepal
 List of Ultras of the Himalayas

References

External links
 "Kubi Gangri, Nepal/China" on Peakbagger

Mountains of the Karnali Province
Mountains of Tibet
China–Nepal border
International mountains of Asia